Environmental and Experimental Botany is a monthly peer-reviewed scientific journal in the field of botany. It was established in 1961 as Radiation Botany, obtaining its current name in 1976. It is published by Elsevier and the editor-in-chief is Sergi Munné-Bosch (University of Barcelona). According to the Journal Citation Reports, the journal has a 2021 impact factor of 6.028.

References

External links

Botany journals
Publications established in 1961
Elsevier academic journals
English-language journals
Monthly journals